F. William "John" Rane was an American football coach.  He served as the second head football coach at West Virginia University in Morgantown, West Virginia and he held that position for two seasons, from 1893 until 1894.  His coaching record at West Virginia was 4–3.

Rane was the head coach for West Virginia's first victory on October 7, 1893 but the team still suffered a sound loss to  Washington and Jefferson College by a score of 52 to 0, a bitter repeat of the previous year's loss to Washington and Jefferson by a score of 72 to 0.

Head coaching record

References

Year of birth missing
Year of death missing
West Virginia Mountaineers football coaches